The following tables compare general and technical information for a number of online analytical processing (OLAP) servers. Please see the individual products articles for further information.

General information

Data storage modes

APIs and query languages
APIs and query languages OLAP servers support.

OLAP distinctive features

A list of OLAP features that are not supported by all vendors. All vendors support features such as parent-child, multilevel hierarchy, drilldown.

Data processing, management and performance related features:

Data modeling features:

System limits

Security

Operating systems
The OLAP servers can run on the following operating systems:

Note (1):The server availability depends on Java Virtual Machine not on the operating system

Support information

See also
 Cubes (light-weight open-source OLAP server)
 ClickHouse
 Apache Pinot
 Apache Druid
 icCube
 Oracle Retail Predictive Application Server (RPAS), a retail specific MOLAP/OLAP server using Berkeley DB for persistence
 Palo (OLAP database)

References

 
OLAP Servers
Data management
Data warehousing products